El Cocal is a corregimiento in Las Tablas District, Los Santos Province, Panama with a population of 1,889 as of 2010. Its population as of 1990 was 1,239; its population as of 2000 was 1,486.

References

Corregimientos of Los Santos Province